Nudobius is a genus of beetles belonging to the family Staphylinidae.

The species of this genus are found in Europe and Northern America.

Species:
 Nudobius abessinus Bernhauer, 1915 
 Nudobius africanus Bernhauer, 1912

References

Staphylinidae
Staphylinidae genera